Portugal competed at the 2018 Winter Olympics in Pyeongchang, South Korea, from 9 to 25 February 2018. Portugal's team consisted of two male athletes competing across two sports.

Competitors
The following is the list of number of competitors participating in the Portuguese delegation per sport.

Alpine skiing 

Portugal qualified one male athlete.

Cross-country skiing 

Portugal qualified one male athlete. Lam is Canadian-Portuguese and was born in Macau, at the time under the control of Portugal giving him Portuguese citizenship. Lam grew up in Canada from an early age, and pursued competing for Canada in snowboarding until 2013 when he suffered an injury. Lam switched to cross-country skiing and competing for Portugal in 2015, in the hopes of competing at the Winter Olympics.

Distance

See also
Portugal at the 2018 Summer Youth Olympics

References

Nations at the 2018 Winter Olympics
2018
2018 in Portuguese sport